Ilsa, Harem Keeper of the Oil Sheiks is a 1976 sexploitation women in prison film, the first sequel to Ilsa, She Wolf of the SS.

Plot
Three crates arrive at the harem. Inside each is a gagged, buxom, chastity belt-wearing Western woman: the sole heiress of a "chain store king of the United States", a film actress dubbed "the new Scandinavian love goddess" in the media, and an Asian-European equestrian champion.

Sheikh El-Sharif lies in bed while his personal sex slave, Katsina, lovingly rubs her breasts against him. El-Sharif confirms his promise to let her accompany him on his travels the next day, starting after meeting with an American oil businessman, who is accompanied by an American Navy commander.

Ilsa, who manages the harem, promises luxury to the new women, but they oppose their white slavery. Ilsa, who herself has no lover, declines having a Western man kidnapped for her, stating she is repulsed by the notion of a man who would sleep with her just because he must.

Ilsa prepares them by forcing them to perform cunnilingus and erotic massage on one of her lesbian bodyguards. To satisfy fetish demands, Ilsa has an existing sex slave force-fed, and then inspects two other consensually-fattened sex slaves. Silicone is used to enhance the buttocks of another.

A public auction is held to sell existing male and female sex slaves. When a belly dancer is caught spying, Ilsa uses a fiendish torture device to crush the belly dancer's large bare breasts. The victim reveals the American Commander sought inside information.

The Americans arrive. The businessman is offered a woman, but refuses. He later finds in his bedroom a young boy sex slave, who claims that refusal would mean severe punishment for the boy.

Ilsa immediately has an eye for the commander and dresses up. Crowding together on a couch near her bedroom, her lesbian bodyguard duo perform a make-out session, but he is uninterested. She insults his manhood and he reacts by groping her. She sends him away, but he shoves her into bed. She is angered at first, but eventually chooses to have sex.

Ilsa devises penetration-triggered, exploding diaphragms, using a mechanical dildo machine to demonstrate it on the belly dancer / spy, who dies. Sharif has one put in Katsina while she is unconscious, and then prepares her to visit a rival sheikh.

Sharif is about to sleep with the American heiress, when a vengeful local subject accidentally snipes her to death. The American commander disapproves when the sniper is burned to death without a trial.

Sharif finds the commander in bed with Ilsa. Sharif puts the commander in prison, then has Ilsa tied up. He has a leper grope her large bare breasts, perform cunnilingus on her, then mount her and reach a climax while the others watch in horror.

Once she "learns her lesson", Ilsa initiates a rebellion. She frees the commander, killing his prison guard and a tarantula that has almost entered his face-cage. Ilsa reveals that Sharif's young nephew, Prince Salim, is locked up to prevent him inheriting the sheikhdom. Ilsa's bodyguard duo free the two remaining new sex slaves and give them guns. Sharif's guards kill Ilsa's bodyguards, but she captures Sharif and frees Prince Salim.

Sharif is chained and gagged. Ilsa tells his loving Katsina that Sharif's final wish before his execution is sleeping with her, then removes Katsina's chastity belt. Knowing about her diaphragm-bomb, Sharif twists beneath his gag, but Katsina mounts and rapes him. Sharif tries to withhold himself, but Ilsa encourages Katsina to push herself harder on top of him, activating the bomb. The commander arrives just then, reminds Ilsa that Katsina was innocent, and dumps Ilsa in resentment.

Nevertheless, he reminds the prince that Ilsa did save his life, when she pledges her allegiance to him. Unimpressed, the prince sentences Ilsa to slow starvation and releases the commander to leave the country.

Cast
 Dyanne Thorne as Ilsa
 Max Thayer as commander
 Jerry Delony as Sheikh El-Sharif
 Uschi Digard as Inga Lindström
 Colleen Brennan as Nora Edward 
 Haji as Alina Cordova
 Tanya Boyd as Satin
 Marilyn Joi as Velours
 Su Ling as Katsina
 Richard Kennedy as Kaiser
 George Buck Flower as Beggar
 Bobby Woods as Prince Salim

References

External links

1976 films
English-language Canadian films
1970s English-language films
Women in prison films
Canadian sexploitation films
1970s exploitation films
Canadian prison films
1970s Canadian films